3'-Hydroxy-THC (3'-OH-Δ9-THC) is a minor active metabolite of THC, the main psychoactive component of cannabis. It is one of a number of metabolites of THC hydroxylated on the pentyl side chain, but while the other side-chain hydroxyl isomers are much weaker or inactive, the S enantiomer of 3'-OH-THC is several times more potent than THC itself, and while it is produced in smaller amounts than other active metabolites such as 11-Hydroxy-THC and 8,11-Dihydroxy-THC, it is thought to contribute to the overall pharmacological profile of cannabis.

See also 
 7-Hydroxycannabidiol
 11-Hydroxy-Delta-8-THC
 11-Nor-9-carboxy-THC

References 

Cannabinoids
Benzochromenes